Lasse Olsson (died probably 1572) was Gustav Eriksson's (House of Vasa) lead warman and key figure in the war of liberation from the Union King Christian II in 1520–1521.  He then had several roles within the royal circle in Västerbotten, Hälsingland,  Norrland and Östergötland. Between 1561 and 1568 he was a member of the royal High board. Lasse Olsson was born in östergötland but was not born into aristrocacy. Two of his sons was later noblemen.

References

1570s deaths
Swedish military personnel
Year of birth unknown